Peter Chadwick  (23 March 1931 – 12 August 2018) was a British applied mathematician and physicist.

A Huddersfield native born on 23 March 1931, Chadwick attended the University of Manchester (BSc, 1952) and completed his PhD at Pembroke College, Cambridge in 1957. He was Professor of Mathematics at the University of East Anglia from 1965 to 1991, and was made a Fellow of the Royal Society in 1977. He died on 12 August 2018, aged 87.

References

1931 births
2018 deaths
20th-century English mathematicians
20th-century British physicists
Alumni of the University of Manchester
Alumni of Pembroke College, Cambridge
Academics of the University of East Anglia
Fellows of the Royal Society
People from Huddersfield
Applied mathematicians